Xanthodaphne tenuistriata is a species of sea snail, a marine gastropod mollusk in the family Raphitomidae.

Description

Distribution
This abyssal species was found in the Izu–Bonin Trench, Northwest Pacific

References

 SYSOEV, AV. "Découvertes de mollusques ultra-abyssaux de la famille des Turridae (Gastropoda, Toxoglossa) dans l'Océan Pacifique. I: Sous-famille des Daphnellinae." Zoologičeskij žurnal 67.7 (1988): 965–972.

External links
 

tenuistriata
Gastropods described in 1988